High House Meadows, Monewden is a three hectare biological Site of Special Scientific Interest west of Monewden in Suffolk.

These unimproved meadows have diverse herbs typical of clay pastures. There are scarce species such as autumn crocus, green-winged orchid, sulphur clover and  adders-tongue fern.

The site is private land with no public access.

References

Sites of Special Scientific Interest in Suffolk